Clonaria is an Asian genus of stick insects belonging to the tribe Gratidiini.

Species
The Catalogue of Life lists:

 Clonaria abdul (Westwood, 1859)
 Clonaria adelungi (Brunner von Wattenwyl, 1907)
 Clonaria aegyptiaca (Gray, 1835)
 Clonaria aestuans (Saussure, 1862)
 Clonaria affinis (Schulthess, 1898)
 Clonaria agrostimorpha (Rehn, 1914)
 Clonaria albida (Sjöstedt, 1909)
 Clonaria angolensis (Rehn, 1912)
 Clonaria annulata (Westwood, 1859)
 Clonaria aphrodite (Rehn, 1914)
 Clonaria arcuata (Karsch, 1898)
 Clonaria arida (Karsch, 1898)
 Clonaria asystasia (Thanasinchayakul, 2006)
 Clonaria beroe (Westwood, 1859)
 Clonaria beybienkoi (Bekuzin, 1960)
 Clonaria bifurcata (Karsch, 1898)
 Clonaria bispinosa (Chopard, 1938)
 Clonaria breviuscula (Bolívar, 1922)
 Clonaria brunneri Kirby, 1904
 Clonaria buchholzi (Gerstaecker, 1883)
 Clonaria bugoiensis (Rehn, 1914)
 Clonaria canaliculata (Sjöstedt, 1924)
 Clonaria capelongata Brock, 2005
 Clonaria capemontana Brock, 2007
 Clonaria cederbergensis Brock, 2006
 Clonaria conformans (Brunner von Wattenwyl, 1907)
 Clonaria congoensis (Sjöstedt, 1909)
 Clonaria cristata (Brunner von Wattenwyl, 1907)
 Clonaria cryptocercata (Rehn, 1912)
 Clonaria cylindrica (Sjöstedt, 1909)
 Clonaria damicornis (Bolívar, 1922)
 Clonaria deschauenseei Rehn, 1933
 Clonaria dicranura (Uvarov, 1939)
 Clonaria digitalis (Sjöstedt, 1924)
 Clonaria eitami (Brock & Shlagman, 1994)
 Clonaria elgonensis (Sjöstedt, 1934)
 Clonaria ensis (Bolívar, 1922)
 Clonaria evanescens (Karsch, 1898)
 Clonaria excisa (Sjöstedt, 1909)
 Clonaria fissa (Karsch, 1898)
 Clonaria flavescens (Sjöstedt, 1909)
 Clonaria forcipata (Karsch, 1898)
 Clonaria fritzschei (Zompro, 2000)
 Clonaria furcata (Brunner von Wattenwyl, 1907)
 Clonaria furcifer (Sjöstedt, 1909)
 Clonaria gigliotosi Otte & Brock, 2005
 Clonaria globosa (Brunner von Wattenwyl, 1907)
 Clonaria gracilipes (Westwood, 1859)
 Clonaria gracilis (Chopard, 1938)
 Clonaria graminis (Sjöstedt, 1909)
 Clonaria guenzii (Bates, 1865)
 Clonaria guilielmi (Sjöstedt, 1924)
 Clonaria hamuligera (Schulthess, 1898)
 Clonaria incisa (Chopard, 1938)
 Clonaria inclinata (Karsch, 1898)
 Clonaria inconspicua (Brunner von Wattenwyl, 1907)
 Clonaria indica (Gray, 1835)
 Clonaria insolita (Brunner von Wattenwyl, 1907)
 Clonaria insulsa (Brunner von Wattenwyl, 1907)
 Clonaria javanica (Haan, 1842)
 Clonaria jeanneli (Chopard, 1938)
 Clonaria kibonotensis (Sjöstedt, 1909)
 Clonaria kivuensis (Rehn, 1914)
 Clonaria kurda (Uvarov, 1944)
 Clonaria laminifera (Chopard, 1938)
 Clonaria leprosa (Gerstaecker, 1869)
 Clonaria libanica (Uvarov, 1924)
 Clonaria lindneri (Kevan, 1955)
 Clonaria lineaalba (Rehn, 1914)
 Clonaria lineata (Gray, 1835)
 Clonaria lineolata (Brunner von Wattenwyl, 1907)
 Clonaria longefurcata (Chopard, 1954)
 Clonaria longithorax (Brunner von Wattenwyl, 1907)
 Clonaria luethyi (Zompro, 2000)
 Clonaria manderensis (Chopard, 1954)
 Clonaria massaica (Sjöstedt, 1909)
 Clonaria massauensis (Giglio-Tos, 1910)
 Clonaria minuta (Giglio-Tos, 1910)
 Clonaria montana (Brunner von Wattenwyl, 1907)
 Clonaria montivaga (Sjöstedt, 1909)
 Clonaria nairobensis (Bolívar, 1919)
 Clonaria naivashensis (Bolívar, 1922)
 Clonaria nana (Mishchenko, 1941)
 Clonaria natalis (Westwood, 1859) - type species (as Bacillus natalis Westwood)
 Clonaria nebulosipes (Rehn, 1911)
 Clonaria nimbana (Chopard, 1955)
 Clonaria nubilipes (Sjöstedt, 1924)
 Clonaria obocensis (Brunner von Wattenwyl, 1907)
 Clonaria parva (Zompro, 1998)
 Clonaria pedunculata (Rehn, 1914)
 Clonaria planicercata (Rehn, 1914)
 Clonaria polita (Sjöstedt, 1909)
 Clonaria postrostrata (Karsch, 1898)
 Clonaria postspinosa (Sjöstedt, 1909)
 Clonaria predtetshenskyi (Bey-Bienko, 1946)
 Clonaria proboscidea (Bolívar, 1922)
 Clonaria prodigiosa (Karsch, 1898)
 Clonaria prolata (Karsch, 1898)
 Clonaria propinqua (Giglio-Tos, 1910)
 Clonaria pulchrepicta (Carl, 1913)
 Clonaria pulchripes (Rehn, 1912)
 Clonaria quinquecarinata (Chopard, 1938)
 Clonaria rectangulata (Bolívar, 1922)
 Clonaria reducta (Brunner von Wattenwyl, 1907)
 Clonaria rehni (Bolívar, 1922)
 Clonaria rubrotaeniatus (Günther, 1956)
 Clonaria ruwenzorica (Rehn, 1914)
 Clonaria sansibara (Stål, 1875)
 Clonaria schaumi (Karsch, 1898)
 Clonaria schizura (Uvarov, 1939)
 Clonaria securigera (Brunner von Wattenwyl, 1907)
 Clonaria sicca (Sjöstedt, 1909)
 Clonaria silvaepluvialis (Sjöstedt, 1909)
 Clonaria simplex (Brunner von Wattenwyl, 1907)
 Clonaria sjoestedti (Rehn, 1914)
 Clonaria sororcula (Rehn, 1914)
 Clonaria specifica (Brunner von Wattenwyl, 1907)
 Clonaria spinulosa (Brunner von Wattenwyl, 1907)
 Clonaria subquadrata (Sjöstedt, 1924)
 Clonaria talea (Karsch, 1898)
 Clonaria tardigrada (Sjöstedt, 1934)
 Clonaria tenuis (Sjöstedt, 1909)
 Clonaria trivittata (Gerstaecker, 1883)
 Clonaria uvaroviana (Mishchenko, 1937)
 Clonaria viridis (Gray, 1835)
 Clonaria voluptaria (Brunner von Wattenwyl, 1907)
 Clonaria werneri (Ebner, 1934)
 Clonaria xiphidophora (Rehn, 1914)

References

External links
 

Phasmatodea genera
Phasmatodea of Asia
Gratidiini